580 California Street is a high rise office building completed in 1987 in the Financial District of San Francisco, California. The postmodern, 23 story tower is bordered by Kearny Street and California Street, and is topped with three faceless, -tall statues, on each side of the building on the twenty-third floor. The art installation is entitled "The Corporate Goddesses" by Muriel Castanis, the late designer and creator of the sculptures.

Tenants 
 Akin, Gump, Strauss, Hauer & Feld, LLP
 CEB
 Consulate General of Canada 
 Huron Consulting Group
 Motive Medical Intelligence
 Northern Trust Corporation
 State Farm Insurance
 Welocalize
 Wetherby Asset Management
 Osborne Partners Capital Management
 Oppenheimer & Co. Inc
 Troutman Sanders LLP
 Recommind
Academia.edu
Zenith American Solutions

See also
 San Francisco's tallest buildings

References

External links
 580 California project page at Philip Johnson · Alan Ritchie Architects
 580 California Street at Hines Interests Limited Partnership

Office buildings completed in 1987
Financial District, San Francisco
Hines Interests Limited Partnership
Skyscraper office buildings in San Francisco